Duligotuzumab (INN) is a humanized IgG1 monoclonal antibody designed for the treatment of cancer. It acts as an immunomodulator and binds to HER3. It is in development by Roche. Clinical development for head and neck cancer and colorectal cancer have been discontinued, but phase I trials in combination with cobimetinib are evaluating safety for treatment of solid tumors.

References 

Monoclonal antibodies for tumors
Experimental cancer drugs